Parisa J. Fakhri is an Iranian American actress and voice actress who lives in Texas and works for Funimation. Her voice roles include Arisa Uotani in Fruits Basket (2001) and Bra in Dragon Ball GT. She has guest-starred in a number of live action television series, such as House, CSI:NY, and Agents of S.H.I.E.L.D. From 2009 to 2013, she starred as Mira in the series Dwelling, and in 2022,  appeared in several episodes of What We Do in the Shadows as Marwa, one of Nandor's thirty-seven wives.

Filmography

Television roles
 Make It or Break It - Dr. Eileen Curtis (Episode: "Growing Pains")
 Castle - Colette (Episode: "Till Death Do Us Part")
 House M.D. - Susan (Episode: "Saviors")
 Eli Stone - Sana (Episode: "Should I Stay or Should I Go?")
 Agents of S.H.I.E.L.D. (Episodes: "A Fractured House" as Senator's Aide and "Love in the Time of HYDRA" as Lt. Decker)
 The Thundermans - Lady Web (Episode: "A Hero Is Born", and "Secret Revealed")
 SEAL Team - Naima Perry
 What We Do in the Shadows - Marwa

Anime roles
 Case Closed - Rene Kinsella (Ep. 11–12), Sarah (Ep. 27)
 Dragon Ball GT - Bra, Bulma Leigh (Ep. 64)
 Fruits Basket (2001) - Arisa Uotani
 Fullmetal Alchemist - Elisa (Ep. 11–12)
 Kiddy Grade - Rita Verruccio (Ep.9)

Video game roles
 Dying Light - Troy and other characters

References

External links
 
 

1975 births
Living people
American people of Iranian descent
American Shia Muslims